is a railway station on the Aoimori Railway Line in the town of Oirase in Aomori Prefecture, Japan, operated by the third sector railway operator Aoimori Railway Company.

Lines
Shimoda Station is served by the Aoimori Railway Line, and is 37.0 kilometers from the terminus of the line at Metoki Station. It is 654.3 kilometers from Tokyo Station.

Station layout
Shimoda Station has a one ground-level island platform and one ground-level side platform serving three tracks connected to the station building by a footbridge. However, only tracks 1 and 3 are in use, and track 2 is used as a siding. The station is staffed.

Platforms

Bus services
Towada Kanko Bus
For Towada via Rokunohe
For Hachinohe via Tagadai-Danchi

History
Shimoda Station was opened on December 20, 1891 as a station on the Nippon Railway. It became a station on the Tōhoku Main Line of the Japanese Government Railways (JGR), the pre-war predecessor to the Japan National Railway (JNR) after the nationalization of the Nippon Railway on November 1, 1906. Regularly scheduled freight services were discontinued in October 1971, and it has been managed from Misawa Station since February 1983. With the privatization of the JNR on April 1, 1987, it came under the operational control of JR East.

The section of the Tōhoku Main Line including this station was transferred to Aoimori Railway on December 4, 2010.

Surrounding area
Oirase River
former Shimoda Town Hall

See also
 List of Railway Stations in Japan

References
 JTB Timetable December 2010 issue

External links

Aoimori Railway station information page 

Railway stations in Aomori Prefecture
Railway stations in Japan opened in 1891
Oirase, Aomori
Aoimori Railway Line